This is a list of Indonesian football transfers for the sale in 2010–11 season. Only moves from Indonesia Super League and Liga Indonesia Premier Division are listed.

The 2010-11 transfer window

References

Lists of Indonesian football transfers
Indonesian